Gaizka Bergara Picaza (born 7 February 1986) is a Spanish professional footballer who plays as a defender.

Football career
Bergara was born in Bilbao, Biscay. Having emerged through Athletic Bilbao's prolific youth ranks, Lezama, he made his first-team – and La Liga – debut on 25 February 2007, coming on as a substitute for Josu Sarriegi during a 0–3 away loss against FC Barcelona, but spent the vast majority of his stint at the club with the reserves.

In summer 2008, Bergara was released and joined Basque neighbours Sestao River Club, in the third division. He continued competing in that level in the following years, mainly with CD Laudio and Arenas Club de Getxo.

References

External links

1986 births
Living people
Spanish footballers
Footballers from Bilbao
Association football defenders
La Liga players
Segunda División B players
Tercera División players
CD Basconia footballers
Bilbao Athletic footballers
Athletic Bilbao footballers
Sestao River footballers
CD Laudio players
Arenas Club de Getxo footballers
Club Portugalete players